Triangle (officially published and stylized as the symbol ⊿, pronounced ) is the title of the second original studio album of Japanese girl group Perfume. Triangle was officially announced at Perfume's Disco!Disco!Disco! concert, and was released on July 8, 2009 as a CD-only version and limited edition CD+DVD version, which featured promotional music videos and live performances.

Triangle was released seven weeks after Yasutaka Nakata's effort with Meg, Beautiful. Despite selling lower than their first original album, Game, Triangle was certified platinum by RIAJ for selling over 250,000 copies.

Overview
The first track, "Take off" is a less than one minute instrumental. It plays the role as the introduction of the whole album and leads to the second song, "love the world, the seventh major single. "Dream Fighter" is the eighth major single. The next song "edge (⊿-mix)" is the b-side song from the single "love the world". This mix is over eight minutes and a little longer than the extended mix in the single. "NIGHT FLIGHT" is an 80's technopop-like song, which features a chopper bass. It was used in ads for Morinaga Milk's Pino Airlines campaign. Like the concept of the ads, the lyrics compare love with airplane flying. "Kiss and Music" is an R&B and hip hop influenced song. "Zero Gravity" is an electronic house song which features an electric piano. "I Still Love U" is an 80's Japanese idol R&B-pop-like song. It received an exclusive video, available on the limited edition DVD. "The best thing" is the ninth track of the album which was described as Yasutaka Nakata's (producer of Perfume) signature sound with arpeggios and a house track. "Speed of Sound" is a Latin trance-house-like song which has few words (similar to Meg's song Make Love). "One Room Disco" is the ninth major single. The finale is "Negai (Album-mix)". The song originally was a low-tempo ballad song in the b-side of "Dream Fighter", but in the album, the song features more strings, and is arranged to be more orchestral.

The exclusive promotional video for "I Still Love U" features Perfume dressed in white against a white background, singing to the camera entirely in a one-shot, profile-height video. The video features a very low depth of field, significantly blurring anything too close to the foreground or background. As they sit down for the final minute or so of the video, the girls start to break down laughing from pain as they receive foot massages off screen; all of them try hard to, and eventually regain, their composure. Their laughter can be heard as the screen cuts to black.

The B-side track of "One Room Disco" ("23:30") was not included in this album.

Track listing

Personnel
From All Music.com.
 Iku Aoki - Director 
 Kohei Furumai - Executive Producer 
 Tatsuro Hatanaka - Supervisor 
 Nomura Hiroshi - Photography 
 Sumio Matsuzaki - Supervisor 
 Kiyoe Mizusawa - Design Coordinator 
 Masahiro Nakawaki - Director 
 Ayaka "A-Chan" Nishiwaki - Group Member 
 Yuka "Kashiyuka" Kashino - Group Member 
 Ayano "Nocchi" Omoto - Group Member 
 Yokichi Osato - Supervisor 
 Masako Osuga - Make-Up 
 Kazuaki Seki - Art Direction 
 Yuki Shimajiri - Hair Stylist 
 Masahiro Shinoki - Executive Producer 
 Hirose Shiraishi - Executive Producer 
 Ken Uchizawa - Stylist 
 Yasutaka Nakata - Arranger, Composer, Engineer, Mastering, Mixing, Producer 
 Mayuko Yuki - Design

Charts

Certifications

References 

2009 albums
Japanese-language albums
Tokuma Shoten albums
Perfume (Japanese band) albums
Albums produced by Yasutaka Nakata